William Blake (1757–1827) was an English poet, visionary, painter, and printmaker.

William Blake may also refer to:
 William Blake (economist) (1774–1852), English writer on monetary policy and government expenditure
 William Blake (outlaw) (1859–1895), outlaw of the Old West, and member of the Wild Bunch gang
 William Hume Blake (1809–1870), Canadian jurist and politician 
 William J. Blake (1894–1968), American writer and husband of Christina Stead
 William Phipps Blake (1826–1910), American mineralogist and geologist
 William Rufus Blake (1805–1863), stage actor
 William Blake (died 1630), MP for Heytesbury
 William John Blake (1805–1875), British Whig politician
 William Blake, a character in Dead Man

See also
 The William Blakes, Danish pop rock band
 William Blake Herron, American film screenwriter, director and actor
 William Blake Richmond (1842–1921), English painter and decorator
 Will Blake (born 1991), American painter